Anthony "Scotty" Washington (born July 26, 1997) is an American football tight end for the New England Patriots of the National Football League (NFL).

College career
Washington played college football at Wake Forest from 2015 to 2019. 
After redshirting his first year in 2015, he didn't see the field until 2016. Washington finished 2016 with 155 yards in 10 receptions and no touchdowns. In 2017, Washington had his best season, finishing with 45 receptions, 711 yards and three touchdowns. In 2018, Washington finished with 243 yards on 20 receptions and three touchdowns. In his senior season, Washington finished with 607 yards on 35 receptions and seven touchdowns in only eight games played.

Professional career

Cincinnati Bengals
Washington signed with the Cincinnati Bengals as an undrafted free agent following the 2020 NFL Draft on April 27, 2020. Washington was waived by the Bengals on September 5, 2020, and signed to the practice squad the next day. Washington spent all of the 2020 and 2021 seasons on the team's practice squad. He was waived on August 22, 2022.

New England Patriots
On September 20, 2022, Washington was signed to the New England Patriots practice squad. On a Christmas Eve game against his former team, the Bengals, Washington was involved in a trick play, on a 3rd and 29, Patriots quarterback Mac Jones targeted Washington in the end zone and batted the ball back to Wide Receiver Jakobi Meyers for a touchdown. He signed a reserve/future contract on January 10, 2023.

References

External links
 Wake Forest bio
 Cincinnati Bengals profile

1997 births
Living people
Wake Forest Demon Deacons football players
Cincinnati Bengals players
New England Patriots players